Glacier Bancorp, Inc. is a regional multi-bank holding company headquartered in Kalispell, Montana. It is a successor corporation to the Delaware corporation originally incorporated in 1990. The company provides commercial banking services from locations in Montana, Idaho, Utah, Washington, Wyoming, Colorado, and Arizona through its wholly owned bank subsidiary, Glacier Bank.

The company offers a wide range of banking products and services, including: retail and banking; real estate; commercial, agriculture and consumer loans; and mortgage origination services. Glacier Bancorp Inc. serves individuals, small to medium-sized businesses, community organizations and public entities.

History 
Glacier Bancorp, Inc. was founded in 1955 in Kalispell, Montana.

In 2013, Glacier Bancorp acquired Wyoming-based First State Bank.

In 2015, the company acquired Ronan-based Community Bank.

In 2017, Glacier Bancorp merged with First Security Bank. The same year, the company was named the Montana Lending Institution of the Year by MoFi.

In October 2021, Glacier Bancorp acquired American Fork, UT-based bank, Altabancorp ALTA for $933.5 million.

References

External links
 Official Website

American companies established in 1990
Banks established in 1990
Companies listed on the Nasdaq
Financial services companies established in 1990
Investment banks in the United States
Banks based in Montana
1990 establishments in Montana